Bacchisa atritarsis is a species of beetle in the family Cerambycidae. It was described by Pic in 1912. It is known from China.

References

A
Beetles described in 1912
Beetles of Asia